ZuluTrade is a Greek financial technology company that operates an online and mobile social and copy trading platform. The platform allows users to copy other traders in the forex.  ZuluTrade had around one million users and an executed trading volume of over $800 billion.

History
ZuluTrade was founded in 2007 by Leon Yohai and Kosta Eleftheriou.  Eleftheriou left the company in 2008. Yohai traded on the FXCM trading platform prior to founding ZuluTrade. He created a software connected to FXCM's API that allowed him to copy trading strategies in his realm of interest. The concept was then put into beta in 2008. By 2009, the company had over 4,500 "expert" trader (or "signal provider") portfolios whose trading strategies could be copied by the platform's user base.

In 2011, ZuluTrade was listed among The Daily Telegraphs "Start-Up 100" in the category of "Finance, Payments and Ecommerce." The company also unveiled several new features including the ability to follow other followers (rather than just signal providers) and the requirement for signal providers to be profitable in order to receive payment. In November 2012, ZuluTrade redesigned their website and added more new features including ZuluGuard. By the end of 2013, the company had around 120 employees, 40 of whom were designated for customer support.

In September 2014, Zulutrade expanded in Japan through the acquisition of a regulated investment advisor, Market Crew Investment Advisor Co., Ltd., and launched its collaboration with local FX retail brokers. The first Japanese broker was Arena FX Co., Ltd. In March 2015, ZuluTrade Group announced that the platform was awarded an EU Portfolio Management License from the European Union. The designation made the company a licensed portfolio management company in the EU.
 
In December 2021, ZuluTrade joined Finvasia Group. Finvasia has been working to increase its reach in Europe, North America and Middle-East in various ways in order to create a complete ecosystem for retail and institutional investors.

With ownership of more than a dozen brands in the fintech and financial services industry, Finvasia reaches millions of investors around the world. It has offices in over 5 countries, serves clients in more than 150 countries and is regulated by over a dozen regulators around the globe. 

Recently, the organization has been acquired by Finvasia.

Service
The ZuluTrade service is a social and copy trading online platform that allows users to mimic the investing strategies of trading "experts" in forex markets. The user base is typically split into two categories: signal providers and followers. Signal providers are generally traders that have developed a strategy willing to share and can be copied by their followers. Followers can also mimic strategies of the portfolios created by other followers. Signal provider compensation fees are based on the success and popularity of their trading strategies.

The platform also has several features, including ZuluGuard, that automatically unfollows a signal provider if their trading strategies change. Lock Trade allows users to verify the execution of a trade after the signal has been received. The website also features several social network-like features including comments and forums. The platform also has a feature called ZuluScript which allows users to create scripts that designate specific parameters as criteria for trading robots (known as "Expert Advisors") to automatically start making trades. Additionally, ZuluTrade operates a binary option social trading platform.

ZuluTrade provides rankings of investor performance and allow investors to immediately observe and copy other trader's portfolios. This is provided by simulator which shows overall profit, alerts user if a margin call occurred and even allows user to download a spreadsheet of all the simulated trades.

References

External links

 

Financial services companies of the United States
American companies established in 2007
Financial services companies established in 2007
Financial derivative trading companies
Foreign exchange companies
Companies based in Virginia
2007 establishments in Virginia